Thomas Paris (born in 1970 in Besançon) is a French author.

Publications 
1994: Thomas Paris and Eileen Paris, I'll never do to my kids what my parents did to me!: a guide to conscious parenting, Warner Books Inc., (published in German under the title Nicht wie meine Eltern, Scherz, 1999)
2002: Le droit d'auteur : l'idéologie et le système, preface by 
2003: in collaboration with Maryvonne de Saint-Pulgent and Pierre-Jean Benghozi, Mondialisation et diversité culturelle, IFRI-Institut français des relations internationales
2005: Pissenlits et petits oignons, Buchet/Chastel
2006: Avec ses moustaches, Buchet/Chastel
2015: La Tournée d'adieux, at Buchet/Chastel,

References

External links 
 Association Presaje

21st-century French non-fiction writers
French political scientists
1970 births
Living people
Writers from Besançon